Tapio Nurmela (born 2 January 1975 in Rovaniemi) is a Finnish nordic combined athlete who competed during the 1990s. He won a silver medal in the 4 x 5 km team event at the 1998 Winter Olympics in Nagano. Nurmela also won two medals in the 4 x 5 km team event at the FIS Nordic World Ski Championships with a gold in 1999 and a silver in 1997.

External links
 
 

1975 births
Living people
People from Rovaniemi
Finnish male Nordic combined skiers
Nordic combined skiers at the 1994 Winter Olympics
Nordic combined skiers at the 1998 Winter Olympics
Olympic silver medalists for Finland
Olympic medalists in Nordic combined
FIS Nordic World Ski Championships medalists in Nordic combined
Medalists at the 1998 Winter Olympics
Sportspeople from Lapland (Finland)
20th-century Finnish people